The Mazda CX-5 is a compact crossover SUV produced by Mazda since 2012. A successor to both the Tribute and the slightly larger CX-7, it is Mazda's first model to feature the "Kodo" design language and the first model to be fully developed with a range of technologies branded as Skyactiv, including a rigid, lightweight platform combined with a series of engines and transmissions to reduce emissions and fuel consumption.

Since 2019, the CX-5 is positioned above the smaller CX-30. , depending on the region, the CX-5 is positioned right below the larger CX-50, CX-60 or the CX-8 within Mazda's crossover SUV line-up.

The CX-5 has been the worldwide best-selling model offered by the brand every year since 2014, with record sales in 2019 when 444,262 units were sold globally. , cumulative sales of the CX-5 has reached around 3.5 million vehicles.



First generation (KE; 2012) 

The  concept car, unveiled at the 2011 Geneva Motor Show, was the first Mazda vehicle to combine the company's Kodo design language and Skyactiv technologies. Its design served as a preview of the CX-5.

In rapid development from 2009 to 2011 under Hideaki Tanaka and styled under Masashi Nakayama from 2009 to 2010, the CX-5 was first shown at the September 2011 Frankfurt Motor Show. The Japanese model was unveiled at the 2011 Tokyo Motor Show, while a customized variant featuring a red exterior body colour, alloy wheels painted in matte black, and a slightly lower body height was unveiled in 2012 at the Tokyo Auto Salon.

It shares the platform used by the third-generation Mazda3 and the third-generation Mazda6.

The production model went on sale in February 2012, with initial choice of a Skyactiv-G 2.0 petrol engine or a Skyactiv-D 2.2 diesel engine matched to a Skyactiv-Drive six-speed automatic transmission or a six-speed manual transmission.

Japanese production of the CX-5 fitted with a began in January 2012 at the Ujina plant near Mazda's headquarters in Hiroshima. In July 2012, production of the model at Ujina was set to increase to 240,000 units per year by expanding production from Ujina Plant No.2 to Ujina Plant No.1.

At its introduction in 2012, it won the Car of the Year Japan award.

Engine and drivetrain 

Markets
Japan
The Japan domestic market CX-5 achieved monthly sales 8 times higher than forecast just after its launch in February 2012, with the Skyactiv-D 2.2 diesel engine marketed as a "clean diesel" accounting for 73 percent of the sales.

Malaysia 
The first-generation CX-5 was launched in Malaysia in May 2012 as a fully imported model. At launch, only one trim level was offered, with the 2.0 L Skyactiv-G engine and 6-speed automatic transmission with a choice of FWD or AWD. In June 2013, locally assembled models became available. The fully imported trim was renamed to High Spec, and a new lower trim level, Mid Spec, was launched. The Mid Spec was only available with FWD, while the High Spec continued to be offered with both FWD and AWD. In April 2015, a new base variant, dubbed the GL, was launched.

The first-generation facelift was launched in Malaysia in May 2015. Initially, the facelift version was fully imported and only available with the 2.5 L engine, but again, consumers could choose between FWD or AWD. The locally assembled facelift version was made available in early 2016 with either a 2.0 L Skyactiv-G engine or a 2.5 L Skyactiv-G engine. The 2.0 L engine could be had with only FWD but two trim levels: Mid Spec and High Spec, with Mid Spec being the more affordable of the two. The 2.5 L engine was only available with one trim level, but with either FWD or AWD. In July 2016, a 2.2 L Skyactiv-D powered, FWD, locally assembled variant was launched in Malaysia. It was positioned in between the 2.5 L Skyactiv-G FWD and 2.5 L Skyactiv-G AWD variant.

Australia 
The Australian version of the CX-5 was first introduced in 2012 and was available in Maxx, Maxx Sport, Grand Touring and Akera trim levels. Initial models were available with either a 2.0 L petrol engine or a diesel engine, with front-wheel drive and all-wheel drive as options (FWD was only available with a 2.0-equipped CX-5). An automatic transmission was standard on all-wheel drive models, with manual available on the 2.0 Maxx FWD petrol).

Europe 
Early European models included a choice of Skyactiv-G 2.0 and Skyactiv-D 2.2 engines.

North America 
The CX-5 debuted in the U.S. at the November 2012 Los Angeles Auto Show.

For the 2014 model year, an optional 2.5-liter four-cylinder Skyactiv petrol engine was introduced to address the main criticism of the CX-5. Only the six-speed automatic transmission is available for this engine, which is standard on the Touring and Grand Touring trim levels. The base Sport trim level is still offered with the 2.0 L engine. Front-wheel drive and all-wheel drive are offered for all trim levels.

The 2013 Mazda CX-5 was one of the five finalists for the 2013 Green Car of the Year awarded by the Green Car Journal at the 2012 Los Angeles Auto Show.

In 2022, Mazda CX-5 was ranked at third place on US News. It has sleek, quiet interior with thought-out details and high-quality materials.

Facelift 
The facelifted Mazda CX-5 was unveiled at the 2014 Los Angeles Auto Show as a 2016 model. Notable changes include updates to exterior styling, reductions in road noise, an improved infotainment system, and a sport mode for the six-speed automatic transmission. LED headlights, LED fog lights and combination LED tail lights was also offered as for higher grade levels.

In the U.S. and Canada, the update was designated as a 2016.5 model year iteration. The Skyactiv-G 2.5 engine was made standard on all United States trim levels, except the base-level Sport equipped with the six-speed manual transmission and front wheel drive, which retained the 2.0-liter powerplant.

Safety 

According to the Insurance Institute for Highway Safety, the 2013 CX-5 achieved Good crash test ratings in the Moderate Overlap Front, Side, Roof Strength, and Head Restraint & Seats categories, while achieving only a Marginal rating in the Small Overlap Front crash test. Design changes were subsequently made that brought up the Small Overlap Front rating up to a Good rating.

The small overlap test, introduced in 2012 by the IIHS, simulates a frontal collision on 25 percent of the driver's side front corner. Since its adoption, the IIHS has noticed several automakers making non-symmetrical modifications to their vehicles to improve ratings. Another small overlap test was conducted on a number of vehicles, including a 2015 CX-5, but was conducted on the passenger side instead and earned an acceptable rating. Testing showed substantially more intrusion into the passenger side than into the driver's side of the CX-5.

Second generation (KF; 2017) 

The second generation CX-5 was unveiled with an overhauled design and new technologies on November 15, 2016, at the Los Angeles Auto Show. The model is available with Skyactiv-G 2.0 petrol, Skyactiv-G 2.5 petrol and Skyactiv-D 2.2 diesel engines. New features include a new 'Soul Red Crystal' paint colour as well as a new remote-controlled powered tailgate.

In November 2018, Mazda added a new turbocharged petrol engine option from the CX-9 for the 2019 model year CX-5. It is a Skyactiv-G 2.5-liter turbocharged four-cylinder unit which produces  at 5,000 rpm on 93 AKI octane fuel and 227 hp on 87 AKI. Under U.S. fuel economy standards, Mazda claims the new engine delivers  city,  highway, and  combined with AWD, regardless of octane.

Markets

North America 
In the U.S., the 2017 CX-5 was offered with front-wheel or all-wheel drive in Sport, Touring and Grand Touring trims. The Sport and Touring models came with 17-inch wheels, while the GT had 19-inch wheels. The Skyactiv-G 2.5L 16-valve DOHC 4-cylinder engine with VVT was the only choice offered for the 2017 model year.

Mazda announced the availability of a diesel engine for 2017; however, that engine did not arrive in the US until the 2019 model year. However, the diesel engine was only sold for the 2019 model year and was only offered on the top-of-the-line Signature trim level. Mazda cited low consumer demand as well as emissions certification issues.

For the 2018 model year, Mazda added standard cylinder deactivation and made the i-ACTIVSENSE Package available on the Sport trim.

For the 2019 model year, Mazda made available a new turbocharged SKYACTIV-G 2.5T engine and added new Grand Touring Reserve and Signature range-topping trims. A torque vectoring system marketed as G-Vectoring Control Plus was also added on all models.

Changes for the 2020 model year include a new key fob design, an updated font used throughout the vehicle, a new Cylinder Deactivation System status display in the infotainment system. Mazda also made automatic headlights, i-Activsense safety features, and automatic rain-sensing windshield wipers standard and the Grand Touring trim received paddle shifters. Mazda claimed to have also improved road noise, vibration, and hardness across all trims. The Grand Touring Reserve trim received a new Engine Harmonics Enhancer to simulate engine noise, a new off-road traction assist system, and a new eight-inch infotainment system.

For the 2021 model year, Mazda introduced a new standard 10.25-inch infotainment system with new Mazda Connect Software. A new Touring Preferred SV Package was offered as well as a new Carbon Edition trim, which offered exclusive exterior and interior styling elements. Models equipped with the 2.5 Turbo engine received a new turbo badge. Signature trims received new safety features such as reverse automatic braking and driver attention alert as well as improved clarity for the 360-degree camera.

For 2022, the CX-5 received facelift changes announced by Mazda in September 2021. Along with exterior changes to the front and rear, Mazda introduced new 17-inch wheels for the S trim and updated the seats to improve comfort. All models became equipped with standard all-wheel drive and horsepower for the turbo engine was increased from  while using 93 octane fuel. Mazda also revised the naming of trims.

For 2023, Mazda has introduced a new color Rhodium White.

Australia 
In Australia, the second generation Mazda CX-5 was released in March 2017. The range consisted of the base model Maxx, continuing onto the Maxx Sport, Touring, GT & Akera editions. It was available with AWD (except the Maxx, which came as 2WD) as standard. The engines available for the car were a 2.2 L twin-turbo diesel engine, a 2.0 L petrol engine, and a 2.5 L petrol engine.

Philippines 
The Philippines was the first ASEAN market to get the second generation CX-5, and is fully imported from Malaysia. The car debuted at the 2017 Manila International Auto Show. Initially offered in 3 trim levels: 2.0 petrol FWD Pro, 2.5 petrol AWD Sport and 2.2 diesel AWD Sport. In late 2019, the 2.5 FWD Sport was added to the lineup. In February 2020, the 2.2 Signature AWD was added to the lineup.

Singapore 
Mazda Singapore officially launched the second-generation CX-5 on July 21, 2017, offered in either 2.0L 2WD or 2.5L 2WD models. Variants include the 2.0L Standard Plus, 2.0L Premium, 2.5L Luxury and 2.5L Super Luxury.

Indonesia 
The second generation CX-5 debuted at the GIIAS 2017. 2 trim levels are sold: 2.5 GT & 2.5 Elite and both are only available in 2WD drivetrains. The facelifted model was released on April 1, 2022, and is offered in Elite and Kuro trim levels.

Malaysia 
The second generation Mazda CX-5 was launched in Malaysia in October 2017. It was available in five variants: the 2.0 2WD GL, 2.0 2WD GLS, 2.5 2WD GLS, 2.2D 2WD GLS and 2.2D AWD GLS. In late 2019, the updated Mazda CX-5 range was launched, with five variants available on sale. The line-up starts with the entry-level 2.0 2WD Mid, 2.0 2WD High, 2.5 2WD High, 2.2D 2WD High, and 2.5 turbo 4WD High. All models are now locally assembled at the Inokom plant in Kulim, Kedah.

Thailand 
In Thailand, the second generation Mazda CX-5 was released on 14 November 2017, and it's fully imported from Malaysia. It is available in five trim levels: the 2.0 petrol 2WD Core (C), 2.0 petrol 2WD High (S), 2.0 petrol 2WD High Plus (SP), 2.2 diesel 2WD XD and 2.2 diesel AWD XDL. In 2019, a new trim level, the 2.5 turbo petrol AWD High Plus (SP), was added.

Facelift 
In September 2021, Mazda revealed a facelift for the second-generation 2022 CX-5 with updated styling and kit. Highlights include restyled bumpers and tailgate with new headlights and tail lights, larger tailpipes, a new Mi-Drive drive selector control, updated seats, and wireless charging. It is also equipped with a revised suspension. The dampening control structure was improved and frame rigidity was increased, helping to reduce vibrations and road noise.

Sales and production

References

External links

CX-5
Compact sport utility vehicles
Crossover sport utility vehicles
Front-wheel-drive vehicles
All-wheel-drive vehicles
Euro NCAP small off-road
Cars introduced in 2012
2020s cars